The A. P. Johnson House, also known as Campbell Residence, is a Frank Lloyd Wright-designed Prairie School home that was constructed in Delavan, Wisconsin, USA, in 1905.  It was listed on the National Register of Historic Places in 1982.

The Johnson house sits on a 6-acre lot on the south shore of Lake Delavan, on a small wooded hill with a view of the water. Wright designed it as he was shifting from more classical designs to fully developed Prairie style like the 1906 Robie House.

Characteristic elements of Prairie Style are the low-pitched hip roofs with wide eaves, the raised central mass, bands of casement windows, and horizontal siding. One-story porches extend from each end parallel to the lake, like wings of the house. The windows contain leaded colored glass, in a decorative pattern that repeats. The house is clad in horizontal tongue-and-groove wood siding, which Wright often used on small cottages. The roof was originally covered with wood shingles, but they have been replaced with asphalt.

The interior included a large central living area with dining room, living room and study more or less open to each other. A large fireplace of Roman brick heats the living room. (The house was originally heated only by its fireplaces.) Bedrooms are upstairs.  Much of the interior was updated from 1980 to 1982, but the exterior is little changed from 1905.

Wright intended that the exterior of the house be finished in a dark natural color, but the house was instead painted white. William Storrer writes:  It is said that when Wright, approaching on horseback via the dirt driveway to supervise final stages of work on this Prairie style tongue-and-groove-sided house, saw it painted white, he rode away, never to return.

References

 Storrer, William Allin. The Frank Lloyd Wright Companion. University Of Chicago Press, 2006,  (S.087)

External links
Johnson House on prairiestyles.com
Johnson House on peterbeers.net
Johnson House on prairieschooltraveler.com

Houses in Walworth County, Wisconsin
Frank Lloyd Wright buildings
Houses on the National Register of Historic Places in Wisconsin
National Register of Historic Places in Walworth County, Wisconsin
Delavan, Wisconsin
Houses completed in 1905
Prairie School architecture in Wisconsin
1905 establishments in Wisconsin